Audience measurement by Nielsen Media Research, commonly referred to as Nielsen ratings, has provided World Series television ratings since at least 1963. Key measurements are ratings, the percentage of all U.S. television-equipped households that watched a game, share, the percentage of television sets in use that were tuned to a game, and total viewers (or viewership), the average number of people watching a game throughout its duration.

Both series went six games and averaged a rating of 32.8 and a share of 56. Average viewership was slightly larger in 1978 (44,278,950) than in 1980 (42,300,000).

Previously, the  four-game sweep of the Detroit Tigers by the San Francisco Giants was the least watched, averaging a 7.6 rating and a 12 share; its average viewership was 12.636 million.

That game also had the smallest viewership in World Series history, 8.156 million.

All four major U.S. broadcast television networks (ABC, CBS, NBC, and Fox) have broadcast the World Series. Fox has been the exclusive broadcast network for the World Series since , and has a contract with MLB to carry the World Series through 2028.

Viewership/rating by year
The graph below shows the average rating (in percentage) and average number of viewers (in millions) for each World Series since 1973; older Nielsen records lack average viewer counts. For example, the 1973 World Series (the leftmost data points) had an average rating of 30.7 (percentage of all U.S. television-equipped households that watched) and an average viewership of 34.8 (million viewers). This chart shows trending over time; specific figures are available in the television ratings by year section.

Least and most viewed World Series
These tables list the World Series with the smallest and largest average viewership (figures in millions) since 1973.

Viewership records for Games 1–7
The following table shows the viewership (figures in millions) records—both largest and smallest—for games one through seven in a World Series since 1973.

Television ratings by year
Figures are expressed as ratings/share. Ratings represent the percentage of U.S. households that watched the game on television. Share represents the percentage of television sets in use that were tuned to the game.

Source: 1968 through 2007 figures are per Nielsen documents; more recent years per inline citations.

See also
 Super Bowl television ratings
 NBA Finals television ratings
 Stanley Cup Finals television ratings
 MLS Cup television ratings

Notes

References

External links
 Game-by-game ratings (1968–2007) spreadsheet via Wayback Machine
 Average viewership (1973–2007) spreadsheet via Wayback Machine

Television ratings
Major League Baseball television ratings
ABC Sports
CBS Sports
Major League Baseball on Fox
Major League Baseball on NBC